Łukasz Bułat-Mironowicz (born 16 August 1985), better known by his stage name Hades, is a Polish rapper. He is also a member of bands HiFi Banda and RH-.

Discography

Studio albums

Music videos

References

Living people
1985 births
Polish rappers